The Autovía CO-32 is the western bypass of Córdoba City. It connects the A-4 and A-45 with the N-437.

References 

CO-32
Transport in Andalusia